The 1958–59 Drexel Dragons men's basketball team represented Drexel Institute of Technology during the 1958–59 men's basketball season. The Dragons, led by 7th year head coach Samuel Cozen, played their home games at Sayre High School and were members of the College–Southern division of the Middle Atlantic States Collegiate Athletic Conference (MASCAC).

The team finished the season 10–9, and finished in 1st place in the MAC in the regular season.

Roster

Schedule

|-
!colspan=9 style="background:#F8B800; color:#002663;"| Regular season
|-

|-
!colspan=9 style="background:#F8B800; color:#002663;"| 1959 Middle Atlantic Conference men's basketball tournament

|-
!colspan=9 style="background:#F8B800; color:#002663;"| Regular season
|-

References

Drexel Dragons men's basketball seasons
Drexel
1958 in sports in Pennsylvania
1959 in sports in Pennsylvania